MEPs Against Cancer is a group of 130 Members of the European Parliament who aim to "promote action on cancer as an EU priority and harness European health policy to that end" and to encourage every country to develop a national plan for combating cancer. It is chaired by Cypriot MEP Loukas Fourlas and French MEP Véronique Trillet-Lenoir. Members of the group come from 25 EU member states and all EU parliament groups.

References

External links

 

European Parliament
Cancer organizations
European medical and health organizations